The Eighty-ninth Minnesota Legislature was the legislature of the U.S. state of Minnesota from January 6, 2015, to January 2, 2017. It was composed of the Senate and the House of Representatives, based on the results of the 2012 Senate election and the 2014 House election. The seats were apportioned based on the 2010 United States census. It first convened in Saint Paul on January 6, 2015, and last met on May 23, 2016. It held its regular session from January 6 to May 18, 2015, and from March 8 to May 23, 2016. A special session to complete unfinished business was held from June 12 to 13, 2015.

Major events
 March 4, 2015: Joint session to elect regents of the University of Minnesota.
 April 9, 2015: 2015 State of the State Address
 March 9, 2016: 2016 State of the State Address

Major legislation

Enacted
 March 17, 2015: Child protection act
 May 5, 2015: Right to Try Act
 May 22, 2015: Omnibus public safety act
 May 22, 2015: Omnibus higher education act
 May 22, 2015: Omnibus health and human services act
 May 22, 2015: Omnibus transportation act
 May 22, 2015: Environment and natural resources trust fund appropriations act
 May 23, 2015: Omnibus state government act
 June 13, 2015: Omnibus jobs, economic development, and energy act
 June 13, 2015: Omnibus legacy act (see also )
 June 13, 2015: Omnibus education act
 June 13, 2015: Omnibus agriculture, environment, and natural resources act
 June 13, 2015: Omnibus capital investment (bonding) act
 May 19, 2016: Nonconsensual dissemination of private sexual images and sexual solicitation act
 May 22, 2016: Controlled substances act
 May 22, 2016: Presidential primary election act
 May 31, 2016: Portable recording systems act
 May 31, 2016: Outdoor heritage fund appropriations act
 May 31, 2016: Environment and natural resources trust fund appropriations act
 Seven appropriations line-item vetoed.
 June 1, 2016: Omnibus supplemental appropriations act

Proposed
Boldface indicates the bill was passed by its house of origin.

 Background checks for firearm transfers bill (/)
 Compassionate Care Act (/)
 Family leave insurance bill (/)
 Gender-specific accommodations bill (/)
 Minimum wage modification for tipped employees bill  (/)
 MNsure governance bill (/)
 Omnibus agriculture, environment, natural resources, jobs, economic development, and energy bill (/)
 Omnibus agriculture, environment, natural resources, jobs, economic development, and energy bill
 Omnibus capital investment (bonding) bill (/)
 Omnibus capital investment (bonding) bill (/)
 Omnibus education policy bill (/)
 Omnibus education policy bill (/)
 Omnibus health, human services, state government, and public safety bill (/)
 Omnibus jobs, economic development, and energy bill (/)
 Omnibus transportation bill (/)
 Real ID implementation bill (/)
 Teacher licensure and employment bill (/)
 Transportation finance bill (/)

Vetoed
 May 21, 2015: Omnibus education bill (/)
 May 23, 2015: Omnibus jobs, economic development, and energy bill
 May 23, 2015: Omnibus agriculture, environment, and natural resources bill (/)
 June 7, 2016: Omnibus tax bill (pocket veto) (/)

Summary of actions
In chapter 186, an environment and natural resources appropriations act, seven appropriations were line-item vetoed. H.F. No. 848, the omnibus tax bill, was pocket vetoed. No bills or items were enacted by the Legislature over the governor's veto.

Political composition
Resignations and new members are discussed in the "Changes in membership" section below.

Senate

House of Representatives

Leadership

Senate
 President: Sandy Pappas (DFL)
 President pro tempore: Ann Rest (DFL)

Majority (DFL) leadership
 Majority Leader: Tom Bakk
 Assistant Majority Leader: Katie Sieben
 Deputy Majority Leader: Jeff Hayden
 Majority Whips:
 Chris Eaton
 Lyle Koenen

Minority (Republican) leadership
 Minority Leader: David Hann
 Assistant Minority Leaders:
 Michelle Benson
 Gary Dahms
 Paul Gazelka
 Bill Ingebrigtsen
 Warren Limmer
 Carrie Ruud
 Minority Whip: David Osmek

House of Representatives
 Speaker: Kurt Daudt (R)
 Speaker pro tempore: Tim O'Driscoll (R)

Majority (Republican) leadership
 Majority Leader: Joyce Peppin
 Majority Whip: Dan Fabian
 Assistant Majority Leaders:
 Dave Baker
 Deb Kiel
 Ron Kresha
 Kathy Lohmer
 Tim Sanders
 Chris Swedzinski

Minority (DFL) leadership
 Minority Leader: Paul Thissen
 Deputy Minority Leaders:
 Melissa Hortman
 Paul Marquart
 Erin Murphy

Members

Senate

House of Representatives

Changes in membership

Senate

House of Representatives

Committees

Senate

House of Representatives

Administrative officers

Senate
 Secretary: JoAnne Zoff
 First Assistant Secretary: Colleen Pacheco
 Second Assistant Secretary: Mike Linn
 Third Assistant Secretary: Jessica Tupper
 Engrossing Secretary: Melissa Mapes
 Sergeant at Arms: Sven Lindquist
 Assistant Sergeant at Arms: Marilyn Logan Hall
 Chaplain: Rev. Dennis Morreim

House of Representatives
 Chief Clerk: Patrick Murphy
 First Assistant Chief Clerk: Tim Johnson
 Second Assistant Chief Clerk: Gail Romanowski
 Desk Clerk: Marilee Davis
 Legislative Clerk: David Surdez
 Chief Sergeant at Arms: Bob Meyerson (from January 29, 2015)
 Assistant Sergeant at Arms: Erica Brynildson
 Assistant Sergeant at Arms: Andrew Olson
 Index Clerk: Carl Hamre

Notes

References

External links
 Legislature
2015 Regular Session Laws
 2015, 1st Special Session Laws
 2016 Regular Session Laws
 Senate
List of bill summaries prepared by the Senate Counsel, Research and Fiscal Analysis Office
 House of Representatives
List of somewhat to very well-known bills compiled by the House Chief Clerk's Office
 List of bill summaries prepared by the House Research Department
 List of act summaries prepared by the House Research Department

Minnesota legislative sessions
2010s in Minnesota
2015 in Minnesota
2016 in Minnesota
2015 U.S. legislative sessions
2016 U.S. legislative sessions